Try This is the third studio album by American singer Pink, released on November 11, 2003, by Arista Records. Wanting to expand more on the rock sound, which she explored on her previous record, Missundaztood, for Try This Pink collaborated with punk band Rancid's singer and guitarist Tim Armstrong, and reunited with Linda Perry, who produced most of the Missundaztood album. As a result of this collaboration, Try This is a rock and roll, pop-punk and pop record, with lyrics exploring such themes as love, separation, fun.

Try This received generally favorable reviews from music critics. However, retrospectively Pink herself expressed dissatisfaction with the record. She said that she was unhappy with the way the label wanted her to make an album after the success of M!ssundaztood. Commercially, the album reached top ten in thirteen countries, including US Billboard 200, where it peaked at number nine, UK, where it reached number three, and Canada, where Try This peaked at number eight. It was certified Platinum in the US by the RIAA for shipments of over one million copies. 

Three singles were released from the record. The lead single, "Trouble", reached top ten in Australia, Canada, UK, and many European countries. Single earned Pink her second Grammy Award, for Best Female Rock Vocal Performance on 2004 show. "God Is a DJ" and "Last to Know", second and third singles respectively, were moderately successful in European charts. However, all of the album singles failed to reach success in US. Some of the album editions also includes single "Feel Good Time" from soundtrack for the movie Charlie's Angels: Full Throttle. Pink supported the album with the Try This Tour in 2004 across Europe and Australia. The live recording of the Manchester show was released in 2006, titled as Pink: Live in Europe.

Background and composition
After the success of Missundaztood (2001) and its accompanying worldwide Party Tour, Pink began work on her third studio album. Wanting to expand more on the rock sound she explored with Missundaztood, Pink sought out producers and writers that had experience within the genre. Most of the tracks on Try This were produced and co-written by punk band Rancid singer and guitarist Tim Armstrong, whom Pink met through a mutual friend at a Transplants video shoot. The two hit it off and Pink ended up co-writing ten songs with him in a week when Transplants were on a tour with the Foo Fighters. Eight of these tracks appeared on Try This, which also features three songs written with Linda Perry, who co-wrote much of Missundaztood, Pink's second album. The album includes a collaboration with electroclash artist Peaches, "Oh My God", and Pink's contribution to the Charlie's Angels: Full Throttle film soundtrack, "Feel Good Time" (produced by and featuring William Orbit), as a non-U.S. bonus track.

Try This was Pink's final studio album under Arista Records. In 2006, Pink said that she was unhappy with the way the label wanted her to make an album after the success of M!ssundaztood. "I was kind of rebelling against the label on that one," she said. "I was going: 'You want a record? Fine, I'll write 10 songs in a week for your fuckin' record and you can press it up and put it out.'" She described the promotional campaign for the album as "an awful time. I was walking out of half my interviews crying. I just felt they were putting a quarter in the slot to watch the monkey dance." Try This is Pink's first album to carry a Parental Advisory warning, and therefore her first album released alongside an edited version. The font used throughout the album's artwork is the same that was used for then label-mates Ace of Base's Cruel Summer single.

Musically, Try This is a pop/rock & roll album, which incorporates elements of punk rock ("Trouble"), R&B ("Catch Me While I'm Sleeping", "Love Song"), new wave and disco ("Humble Neighborhoods").

Critical reception

The album received almost entirely positive reviews from critics with an average Metacritic rating of 71, indicating generally positive reviews. However, there were some negative reviews, with New York magazine stating "Pink pitches a brand of seriousness that is pure Lifetime-TV mawkishness", and The Guardian commented that "Like a lot of pop at the moment, it just sounds like a wan imitation of Pink's second album". Entertainment Weekly gave the album a positive review and called it "A hooky, engaging throwaway that expands Pink's range while holding on fiercely to her irascible inner child."

Commercial performance
Try This debuted at number nine on the U.S. Billboard 200 with first-week sales of 147,000 copies, a weaker debut than that of Missundaztood. The album also reached the top ten on album charts in the UK, Canada and Australia. As of March 2007, it had sold 719,000 copies in the U.S. according to Nielsen SoundScan. Try This re-entered the Australian album chart in June 2009.

The album's first single, "Trouble", a song Armstrong original wrote for his band Rancid in 2003, reached number two in Canada and the top ten in the UK and Australia, but it peaked only at number 68 on the U.S. Billboard Hot 100. In 2003, "Catch Me While I'm Sleeping" was issued as a promotional single in the U.S.; in the same period, a promo CD-R acetate of "Humble Neighborhoods" was made available in the UK. Follow-up single "God Is a DJ" failed to chart on the Hot 100, although it reached number 11 in the UK. A third single, "Last to Know", was released exclusively in Europe and peaked at 21 in the UK.

Pink embarked on the Try This Tour in Europe during 2004, and a DVD chronicling the tour was released in 2006. "Trouble" was used in the films White Chicks (2004), The Princess Diaries 2: Royal Engagement (2004) and Miss Congeniality 2: Armed and Fabulous (2005) as well as the first theatrical trailer for Tangled, and "God Is a DJ" was featured in the film Mean Girls (2004).

Track listing

Notes
  signifies an additional producer.

Personnel
Credits adapted from the album's liner notes.

Pink – lead vocals
Tim Armstrong – guitar, acoustic bass, keyboards, backup vocals, loops, sound effects, engineer, producer
Jonnie "Most" Davis – guitar, acoustic guitar, bass, drum programming, producer, keyboards, engineer, arranger
Linda Perry – guitar, sitar, mellotron, producer
Damon Elliott – percussion, keyboards, programming, producer
John Fields – bass, guitar, percussion, piano, keyboards, drums, wah wah guitar, programming, mixing, engineer, producer
Robbie Campos – acoustic guitar, producer, keyboards, arranger
Dave Carlock – organ, keyboards, bass, drum programming, backup vocals
Matt Mahaffey – synthesizer, glockenspiel, turntables, omnichord, keyboards, drums
Atticus Ross – synthesizer, percussion, loops, engineer
Vic Ruggiero – piano, Hammond organ
David Paich – organ, Hammond organ
Grecco Buratto – guitar
Eric Schermerhorn – guitar
Steve Stevens – guitar
Matt Freeman – bass
Janis Tanaka – bass
Nick Lane – trombone
Lee Thornburg – trumpet
Greg "Frosty" Smith –  baritone sax
Charlie Bisherat – violin
Travis Barker – drums
Dorian Crozier – drums
Joshua Seth Eagan – percussion, drums
Bryan Keeling – drums
Brett Reed – percussion, drums
Galadriel Masterson – backup vocals
Hopey Rock – backup vocals
Lon Price – horn arrangements
Roger Davies – executive producer
Craig Logan – executive producer
Chris Lord-Alge – mixing
Dave Pensado – mixing
Brian Gardner – mastering
David Guerrero – engineer
Dylan Dresdow – engineer
Padraic Kerin – engineer
Steven Miller – engineer, mixing
Tony Cooper – assistant engineer
John "Silas" Cranfield	– assistant engineer
Pat Dammer – assistant engineer
Jay Goin – assistant engineer
Femio Hernández – assistant engineer
Chris Testa – assistant engineer
Ethan Willoughby – assistant engineer
Joshua Sarubin – A&R
Jeri Heiden – art direction, design
Glen Nakasako – art direction, design
Andrew McPherson – photography

Charts

Weekly charts

Year-end charts

Certifications

!scope="row"|Worldwide
|
|2,700,000
|-

References

2003 albums
Albums produced by Linda Perry
Albums produced by William Orbit
Pink (singer) albums
Arista Records albums
LaFace Records albums
Pop albums by American artists
Rock albums by American artists